Heriberto Araújo Rodríguez (born 1983) is a Spanish journalist and writer.

Rodriguez was born in Barcelona.  He resides in Beijing where he works as a correspondent for the Mexican news agency Notimex. His research about Chinese affairs in the world has attracted international recognition.

Books
La silenciosa conquista china (Crítica, 2011, with Juan Pablo Cardenal)

References

External links
 Blog - EL PAIS

1983 births
Living people
People from Barcelona
Spanish journalists
Spanish political writers
Writers about China